The Nationalist Party of the Valencian Country (in Valencian: Partit Nacionalista del País Valencià, PNPV) was a political party created in 1978 by ex-members of the Democratic Union of the Valencian Country. In 1984 the party merged with the Left Grouping of the Valencian Country to form the Valencian People's Union.

Ideology
The party was social democratic, nationalist and defended the link between the Valencian people and the Catalan people, although opposing the Catalan Countries as a political project.

References

Political parties in the Valencian Community
Valencian nationalism
Left-wing nationalist parties